Patrick DeWayne Dopson (born August 24, 1978) is an American gospel musician. He started his music career, in 2012, with the release of Open the Heavens by Oilonit Music, which is his own label, and Central South Distribution. This album was his Billboard magazine breakthrough release upon the Gospel Albums and Heatseeker Albums charts. The song, "Keep Me", was placed on both the WOW Gospel 2013 CD and DVD (music vid).

Early life
Dopson was born in Montgomery, Alabama, on August 24, 1978, as Patrick DeWayne Dopson, whose father is Pastor Gary Dopson, and his mother Patricia Dopson, who are the leaders of Christway Church in Montgomery, Alabama. He has two brothers, Neil and Matt.

Music career
His music career commenced in 2012, with the album, Open the Heavens, that was released on May 1, 2012, by his own label, Oilonit Records alongside Central South Records. This was his Billboard magazine breakthrough release upon the charts of The Gospel Albums at No. 23 and The Heatseeker Albums at No. 46. The song, "Keep Me", was placed on the WOW Gospel 2013 compilation album, and it chart at No. 7 on the Hot Gospel Songs chart. His song, "God Is", peaked at No. 14 on the aforementioned chart.

In July 2019 he became the Associate Pastor of Worship for Oak Cliff Bible Fellowship in Dallas, Texas under Pastor and Founder Tony Evans.

Personal life

Dopson is married to Christina, and together they reside in Alabama.

In 2015 Patrick overcame a life-altering diagnosis of kidney cancer.
"I have a chance to share my testimony in overcoming kidney cancer some years ago," he shares.
He has been cancer free since then..

Discography

References

External links
 Official website

1978 births
Living people
American gospel singers
21st-century American singers
Musicians from Montgomery, Alabama
Songwriters from Alabama
21st-century American male singers
American male songwriters